In organic chemistry, hydrocyanation is a process for conversion of alkenes to nitriles.  The reaction involves the addition of hydrogen cyanide and requires a catalyst.  This conversion is conducted on an industrial scale for the production of precursors to nylon.

Hydrocyanation of unactivated alkenes
Industrially, hydrocyanation is commonly performed on alkenes catalyzed by nickel complexes of phosphite ligands. A general reaction is shown: 
RCH=CH2 + HCN -> RCH2-CH2-CN

Stoichiometry and mechanism
Usually the substrate is an alkene and the product is a nitrile. 

The reaction proceeds via the oxidative addition of HCN to a low-valent metal complex to give a hydrido cyanide complex. Subsequent binding of the alkene gives the intermediate , which then undergoes migratory insertion to give an alkylmetal cyanide. The cycle is completed by the reductive elimination of the nitrile.

Lewis acids, such as triphenylboron, induce reductive elimination of the nitrile product, increasing rates.

In the case of nickel-based systems, catalyst deactivation involves formation of dicyanonickel(II) species, which are unreactive toward alkenes.  The dicyanide arises via two pathways (L = phosphite):
Ni(H)(CN)L2  +  HCN  -> Ni(CN)2L2  +  H2
Ni(R)(CN)L2  +  HCN  ->  Ni(CN)2L2  +  RH

Asymmetric hydrocyanation
Most alkenes are  prochiral, meaning in this context that their hydrocyanation generates chiral nitriles. Conventional hydrocyanation catalysts, e.g.  , catalyse the formation of racemic mixtures.  When however the supporting ligands are chiral, the hydrocyanation can be highly enantioselective. For asymmetric hydrocyanation, popular chiral ligands are chelating aryl diphosphite complexes.

Applications
The most important industrial application is the nickel-catalyzed synthesis of adiponitrile synthesis from buta-1,3-diene. Adiponitrile is a precursor to hexamethylenediamine, which is used for the production of certain kinds of Nylon. The DuPont ADN process to give adiponitrile is shown below:

This process consists of three steps: hydrocyanation of butadiene to a mixture of 2-methyl-butene-3-nitrile (2M3BM) and pentene-3-nitrile (3PN), an isomerization step from 2M3BM (not desired) to 3PN and a second hydrocyanation (aided by a Lewis acid cocatalyst such as aluminium trichloride or triphenylboron) to adiponitrile.

Asymmetric hydrocyanation
Hydrocyanation is important due to the versatility of alkyl nitriles (RCN), which are important intermediates for the syntheses of amides, amines, carboxylic acids and esters.

Naproxen, an anti-inflammatory drug, is prepared via an asymmetric hydrocyanation of a vinylnaphthalene utilizing a phosphinite ligand, L .  The enantioselectivity of this reaction is important because only the S enantiomer is medicinally desirable, whereas the R enantiomer produces harmful health effects. This reaction can produce the S enantiomer with >90% stereoselectivity. Upon recrystallization of the crude product, the optically pure nitrile can be obtained.

History
Hydrocyanation was first reported by Arthur and Pratt in 1954, when they homogeneously catalyzed the hydrocyanation of linear alkenes.
The industrial process for catalytic hydrocyanation of butadiene to adiponitrile was invented by William C. Drinkard.

Transhydrocyanation
In transhydrocyanation, an equivalent of HCN is transferred from a cyanohydrin, e.g. acetone cyanohydrin, to another HCN acceptor.  The transfer is an equilibrium process, initiated by base. The reaction can be driven by trapping reactions or by the use of a superior HCN acceptor, such as an aldehyde.

Hydrocyanation of unsaturated carbonyl compounds
α,β-unsaturated carbonyl compounds undergo hydrocyanation in the absence of metal catalysts.  One manifestation is a special case of the Michael reaction, leading to β-cyanoketones. Another manifestation leads to vinyl cyanohydrins. β-cyano-cyanohydrins are also observed.  Reaction conditions allows access to any of these products.

(1)

Generally acidic conditions favor 1,2-adducts, while basic conditions favor 1,4-adducts. Additions of alkali metal cyanides, for instance, lead exclusively to 1,4-addition. In contrast to alkali metal cyanides and cyanoaluminates, Lewis acidic cyanides, such as TMSCN, favor 1,2-addition. Acetylenic substrates undergo the reaction; however the scope of this reaction is limited and yields are often low.

(5)
1,4-Addition to imines has been observed in a few cases, although imines are often base labile.
(6)
Esters, nitriles and other carbonyl derivatives also undergo conjugative hydrocyanation.

When alkali metal cyanides are used, at least partial neutralization of the reaction medium is usually necessary. Neutralization can be accomplished through an acidic group on the substate itself (internal neutralization). or through the addition of an external acid (external neutralization). Acetic acid is commonly used for this purpose, in a procedure pioneered by Lapworth.
(7)

Conjugative hydrocyanation was used to prepare the steroidal D ring. Diastereoselectivity is generally high in these addition reactions, and the resulting β-cyano carbonyl compounds can be converted to a number of steroidal products.

References

Carbon-carbon bond forming reactions
Addition reactions
Organometallic chemistry
Homogeneous catalysis
Catalysis